Parkash Singh Badal was Chief Minister of Punjab, India for a fourth term from 2007 to 2012.  The following is the list of ministers with their portfolios in the Government of Punjab

Council of Ministers

References

Badal 04
2007 in India
2007 in Indian politics
Badal 04
Cabinets established in 2007
2007 establishments in Punjab, India